Willow Creek is a tributary stream of the Jordan River, in Salt Lake County, Utah.

See also
List of rivers of Utah

References

Rivers of Utah
Rivers of Salt Lake County, Utah
Tributaries of the Jordan River (Utah)
Wasatch Range